Saw Nga Man, also known as Saw Shark, is a retired Burmese Lethwei fighter and former Openweight Lethwei World Champion.

Personal life
Saw Nga Man is an ethnic Karen.

Lethwei career
On March 1, 2009, Saw Nga Man won the Openweight Golden Belt to Lone Chaw in Yangon, Myanmar.

In addition to Lethwei, he represented Myanmar in at the 2013 SEA Games, winning the Silver medal.

On September 21, 2014, Saw Nga Man lost the Openweight Golden Belt to Tun Tun Min at the Thein Pyu Stadium in Myanmar.

On April 18, 2017, Saw Nga Man knocked out Japanese fighter Teruhiko Kubo at Lethwei in Japan 3: Grit inside the Korakuen Hall in Tokyo, Japan.

WLC
In 2017, Saw Nga Man signed an exclusive contract with World Lethwei Championship.

Retirement
On January 9, 2019 just after his fight with Parinya M.U.Den in Taung Ka Lay, Saw Nga Man announced his retirement. With an estimated 190 fights on his record, the 37 year old boxer took off his wraps for good after nearly three decades of fighting. He continues to coach young talent at Shwe Phuu Club, one that he has represented for many years.

Championships and accomplishments

Championships 
Lethwei World Champion
 Openweight Lethwei Golden Belt

 Other championships
  2013 Southeast Asian Games
  2012 Dagon Shwe Aung Lan Champion
  2011 Dagon Shwe Aung Lan Champion
  2010 International Challenge Fight
  2010 Dagon Shwe Aung Lan Champion
  2009 Golden Belt Champion
  2009 Myanmar-Japan Goodwill Letwhei Competition
  2009 Dagon Shwe Aung Lan Champion

Lethwei record 

|- style="background:#c5d2ea;"
| 2019-11-25 || Draw || align="left" | Shwe Sai || Myanmar vs. Thailand Challenge Fights, Myaing Gyi Ngu || Hpa-an, Myanmar || Draw || 5 || 3:00
|- style="background:#c5d2ea;"
| 2019-01-08 || Draw || align="left" | Parinya M.U.Den || 26th Karen New Year Festival, Taung Ka Lay || Hpa-an, Myanmar || Draw || 5 || 3:00
|-
! style=background:white colspan=9 |
|-  style="background:#cfc;"
| 2018-12-19 || Win ||align=left| Yodkunkrai Por.Wiriya || DKBA 24th Anniversary Event, Son See Myaing || Myawaddy Township, Myanmar || KO || 3 ||
|- style="background:#cfc;"
| 2018-06-02 || Win || align="left" | Louis Michael Badato || WLC 5: Knockout War || Naypyitaw, Myanmar || Decision || 5 || 3:00
|-  style="background:#cfc;"
| 2017-12-20 || Win ||align=left| Yodkunkrai Por.Wiriya || 26th Karen New Year Festival, Taung Ka Lay || Hpa-an, Myanmar || KO || 4 || 
|- style="background:#cfc;"
| 2017-11-04 || Win || align="left" | Eddie Farrell || WLC 3: Legendary Champions || Yangon, Myanmar || Decision || 5 || 3:00
|- style="background:#cfc;"
| 2017-04-18 || Win || align="left" | Teruhiko Kubo || Lethwei in Japan 3: Grit || Tokyo, Japan || TKO || 1 ||
|- style="background:#cfc;"
| 2017-03-23 || Win || align="left" | Pravit Sakmuangtalang || Yebyu township challenge fights || Tanintharyi Region, Myanmar || KO || 4 ||
|- style="background:#c5d2ea;"
| 2015-10-25 || Draw || align="left" | Saw Gaw Mu Do || Myanmar Ultimate Fight || Yangon, Myanmar || Draw || 5 || 3:00
|- style="background:#c5d2ea;"
| 2015-08-30 || Draw || align="left" | Tha Pyay Nyo || All Stars Big Fights || Yangon, Myanmar || Draw || 5 || 3:00
|- style="background:#c5d2ea;"
| 2015-07-11 || Draw || align="left" | Saw Gaw Mu Do || Sagaing city challenge fights || Sagaing, Myanmar || Draw || 5 || 3:00
|-  style="background:#fbb;"
| 2014-09-21 || Loss ||align=left| Tun Tun Min || Who is Number One? || Yangon, Myanmar || TKO || 4 || 
|-
! style=background:white colspan=9 |
|- style="background:#c5d2ea;" 
| 2014-08-17 || Draw || align="left" | Too Too || Mandalay Rumbling Champion Challenge || Yangon, Myanmar || Draw || 5 || 3:00
|-  style="background:#fbb;"
| 2014-04-01 || Loss ||align=left| Petchtae Jaipetchkorsang || International Challenge Fights || Mon State, Myanmar || TKO || 2 || 
|- style="background:#c5d2ea;" 
| 2013-10-08 || Draw || align="left" | Pravit Aor.Piriyapinyo || Mandalay city challenge fights || Mandalay, Myanmar || Draw || 5 || 3:00
|- style="background:#c5d2ea;" 
| 2013-02-17 || Draw || align="left" | Tway Ma Shaung || Burmese Championship Challenge Fight || Yangon, Myanmar || Draw || 5 || 3:00
|-  style="background:#cfc;"
| 2012-01-08 || Win ||align=left| Davit || 4th Dagon Shwe Aung Lan Championship Final || Yangon, Myanmar || Decision || 5 || 3:00
|-  style="background:#cfc;"
| 2011-12-11 || Win ||align=left| Kittiphon || 4th Dagon Shwe Aung Lan Championship Semi-Final || Yangon, Myanmar || KO || 3 || 0:54
|-  style="background:#cfc;"
| 2011-11-04 || Win ||align=left| Matthias || Intl. Lethwei Challenge Fights || Mandalay, Myanmar || KO || 3 || 
|- style="background:#c5d2ea;" 
| 2011-08-14 || Draw || align="left" | Naoki Samukawa || Myanmar vs. Japan Goodwill Letwhay Competition || Yangon, Myanmar || Draw || 5 || 3:00
|- style="background:#c5d2ea;" 
| 2011-07-16 || Draw || align="left" | Phoe K || Lethwei Challenge Fights || Yangon, Myanmar || Draw || 5 || 3:00
|-  style="background:#cfc;"
| 2011-01-16 || Win ||align=left| Phoe K || 3rd Dagon Shwe Aung Lan Championship Final || Yangon, Myanmar || Decision || 5 || 3:00
|-  style="background:#cfc;"
| 2010-12-19 || Win ||align=left| Mya Nan Taw || 3rd Dagon Shwe Aung Lan Championship Semi-Final || Yangon, Myanmar || Decision || 5 || 3:00
|- style="background:#c5d2ea;" 
| 2010-09-26 || Draw || align="left" | Cyrus Washington || International Lethwei Challenge Fights || Yangon, Myanmar || Draw || 5 || 3:00
|-  style="background:#cfc;"
| 2010-01-24 || Win ||align=left| Shwe Sai || 2nd Dagon Shwe Aung Lan Championship Final || Yangon, Myanmar || Decision || 5 || 3:00
|-  style="background:#cfc;"
| 2009-09-20 || Win ||align=left| Lone Chaw || 2009 Golden Belt Championship Final || Yangon, Myanmar || Decision || 5 || 3:00
|-  style="background:#cfc;"
| 2009-05-03 || Win ||align=left| Hiroaki Jinkawa || Myanmar vs. Japan Goodwill Letwhay Competition || Yangon, Myanmar || KO || 1 || 
|-  style="background:#cfc;"
| 2009-04-05 || Win ||align=left| Yan Gyi Aung || Dagon Shwe Aung Lan Championship Final || Yangon, Myanmar || KO || 2 || 2:58
|-  style="background:#cfc;"
| 2009-03-01 || Win ||align=left| Lone Chaw || Dagon Shwe Aung Lan Championship Semi-Final || Yangon, Myanmar || Decision || 5 || 3:00
|-
! style=background:white colspan=9 |
|- style="background:#c5d2ea;" 
| 2008-12-21 || Draw || align="left" | Thanwalek Chaiminburi || D.K.B.A 14th Anniversary || Myaing Gyi Ngu, Hpa-an Township, Myanmar || Draw || 5 || 3:00
|- style="background:#c5d2ea;" 
| 2008-09-28 || Draw || align="left" | Lone Chaw || Calsome Challenge Fight-1 || Yangon, Myanmar || Draw || 5 || 3:00
|-  style="background:#cfc;"
| 2008-11-08 || Win ||align=left| Pichichai || Myanmar-Thai International Letwhay Challenge Fight || Yangon, Myanmar || KO || 4 || 2:11
|-
! style=background:white colspan=9 |
|- style="background:#c5d2ea;" 
| 2008-09-28 || Draw || align="left" | Lone Chaw || Calsome Challenge Fight-1 || Yangon, Myanmar || Draw || 5 || 3:00
|-  style="background:#cfc;"
| 2008-08-10 || Win ||align=left| Daung Nyo Lay || Lethwei Challenge Fights || Yangon, Myanmar || KO || 3 || 0:40
|- style="background:#c5d2ea;" 
| 2008-01-27 || Draw || align="left" | Lone Chaw || Sittwe Challenge Fights || Sittwe, Myanmar || Draw || 5 || 3:00
|- style="background:#fbb;" 
| 2007-04-07 || Loss || align="left" | Lone Chaw || Kandawgyi Park Challenge Fights || Yangon, Myanmar || KO || 2 || 2:30
|- style="background:#c5d2ea;" 
| 2007-02 || Draw || align="left" | Lone Chaw || Lethwei Challenge Fights || Tachileik, Myanmar || Draw || 5 || 3:00
|- style="background:#fbb;" 
| 2006-12 || Loss || align="left" | Lone Chaw || Lethwei Challenge Fights || Mon State, Myanmar || KO || 4 || 
|- style="background:#fbb;" 
| 2005-12-18 || Loss || align="left" | Korsuk Sitkriengkrai || DKBA 11th Anniversary Event || Myawaddy Township, Myanmar || KO || 4 || 
|- style="background:#c5d2ea;" 
| 2005-08-07 || Draw || align="left" | Lone Chaw || 23rd Southeast Asian Games placements and Challenge Fights || Yangon, Myanmar || Draw || 5 || 3:00
|-  style="background:#cfc;"
| 2005-05-11 || Win ||align=left| Eh Htee Kaw || Lethwei Challenge Fights || Myanmar || TKO || 5 || 43:00
|-  style="background:#cfc;"
| 2001-04-29 || Win ||align=left| Kyal Ta Pwint || Challenge Fights, Ba Htoo Football field || Mandalay, Myanmar || KO || 4 || 0:55
|-  style="background:#cfc;"
| 1998-04-01 || Win ||align=left| Sanay Thein || 51st Mon National Day, Aung San Indoor Stadium || Yangon, Myanmar || KO || 2 || 
|- style="background:#c5d2ea;" 
| 1997-07-08 || Draw || align="left" | Nga Man Phyu || Challenge Fights, Ba Htoo Football field || Mandalay, Myanmar || Draw || 7 || 3:00
|-  style="background:#cfc;"
| 1997-05-04 || Win ||align=left| Tun Tun || Challenge Fights, Ba Htoo Football field (7R) || Mandalay, Myanmar || KO ||  || 
|-
| colspan=9 | Legend:

References

External links
 Facebook Fan page

Living people
Burmese Lethwei practitioners
Burmese people of Karen descent
1981 births
Southeast Asian Games silver medalists for Myanmar